The Consultive Junta was the government of Central America from its declaration of independence from the Spanish Empire on 15 September 1821 until its dissolution on 21 February 1822. The junta was led by Guatemalan General Gabino Gaínza.

On 5 January 1822, the junta voted for annexation to the First Mexican Empire.

References

Citations

Bibliography 

 
 
 
 

History of Guatemala